Miklós Borz (1921 – July 30, 1992) was a Hungarian soldier and politician, member of the National Assembly (MP) from FKGP Pest County Regional List between 1990 and 1992.

Biography
Miklós Borz was born into an educator family in 1921. He finished his secondary studies in the Benedictine Grammar School in Esztergom. After that he attended the Ludovica Military Academy. He was promoted to Lieutenant in 1944. He fought in the Second World War, and was seriously injured in Christmas 1944. He was captured by the American Army in 1945. After returning to home, his name added to the "B-list". After that he worked as a retailer, laborer then driver. He participated in the Hungarian Revolution of 1956. He was appointed a Chairman of a Workers' Council as a result he was fired from his job in 1958. He worked as an insurance agent until 1963.

He rejoined the FKGP in 1988. Borz secured a mandate in the first democratic parliamentary election in 1990. He was a member of the Committee on Defence since May 3, 1990. He died on July 30, 1992. He was replaced by Mihály Izsó on October 6, 1992.

References

1921 births
1992 deaths
Hungarian soldiers
Hungarian military personnel of World War II
Independent Smallholders, Agrarian Workers and Civic Party politicians
Members of the National Assembly of Hungary (1990–1994)